William Brace (23 September 1865 – 12 October 1947) was a Welsh trade unionist and Liberal and Labour politician.

Early life and career
Born in Risca, in the coal-mining district of Monmouthshire, he was one of six children of Thomas and Anne Brace. Brace briefly attended school before starting work at the local colliery, aged 12. He later worked at Celynnen and Abercarn collieries He soon involved himself in trade union activities and politics and in 1890 was elected the local agent for the Monmouthshire Miners' Association.  He was also elected to Monmouthshire County Council.

Trade Union career
Brace was an early advocate of a single union for all of Britain's colliers, an issue in which he clashed with William Abraham (Mabon). Following the Welsh coal strike of 1898 the Miners' Association became part of the new South Wales Miners' Federation, and Brace was elected its first vice-president. He was later to the union's president from 1912 to 1915.

Parliamentary career
During the early years of the twentieth century, there was considerable debate within Welsh Liberal Party circles around the selection of working men as Liberal candidates. This had intensified after the election Keir Hardie as the first independent Welsh Labour MP in 1900. Hardie made outspoken attacks on nonconformity and the Liberal establishment and this made even moderate labour leaders such as Mabon appear suspect in the eyes of local Liberal associations.  In 1903, Brace presented his name for the South Glamorganshire constituency, held since 1895 by a Conservative landowner. Only after considerable pressure from the Liberal chief whip, Herbert Gladstone, did the Liberal Association in the constituency agree to adopt Brace as their candidate. 

At the 1906 general election he was elected as a Liberal-Labour member of parliament for South Glamorganshire, holding the seat at the next two general elections. He continued taking the Liberal whip for some years, despite the Miners' Federation of Great Britain, which sponsored him, having affiliated to the Labour Party in 1909. During the First World War he held the post of Under-Secretary of State for the Home Department in Lloyd George Coalition Government. He was made a Privy Counsellor in 1916. When the South Glamorganshire seat was abolished at the 1918 general election, he was elected unopposed to represent the new Abertillery seat, this time as Labour Party MP.

Later life
He resigned from the House of Commons in 1920 in the wake of a bitter dispute within the miners' unions. Brace was criticised over his failure to support the "Datum Line" strike while he was equally critical of the "wild" union leaders who were determined to bring about conflict in the coalfields. He decided he could better serve the interests of the coal miners by taking up the position of Labour Advisor to the Ministry of Mines.

His brother George Brace borrowed money from him and other family members to form Brace's Bakery.

Brace married Nellie Humphreys in 1890. The couple had had two sons and a daughter. The younger son, Ivor Llewellyn Brace, became 
Chief Justice of the Supreme Court of Sarawak, North Borneo and Brunei.

William Brace died after a long illness at his home in Allt-yr-yn, Newport in October 1947 aged 82.

References

Sources

Books and Journals

Images

1865 births
1947 deaths
British trade union leaders
Welsh Labour Party MPs
Members of the Privy Council of the United Kingdom
Liberal-Labour (UK) MPs
Miners' Federation of Great Britain-sponsored MPs
UK MPs 1906–1910
UK MPs 1910
UK MPs 1910–1918
UK MPs 1918–1922
People from Risca
Liberal Party (UK) MPs for Welsh constituencies